The State Enterprise Feodosiya Sea Commercial Port is a seaport in the city of Feodosia, Ukraine, located on the southern shore of Feodosia Bay, in the western part of the bay northwest of Cape Feodosia.

See also

List of ports in Ukraine
Transport in Ukraine

References

Companies established in 1895
Buildings and structures in Crimea
Ports of Crimea
Enterprises of Feodosia
Sanctioned due to Russo-Ukrainian War
Transport of Feodosia
1895 establishments in Ukraine